Español may refer to:

from or pertaining to Spain
Spanish language
Spanish people
Djudeo-Espanyol or Judaeo-Spanish, a language spoken by Jews
Argant, an ancient variety of red wine grape alternatively named Espagnol
RCD Espanyol
Club Social, Deportivo y Cultural Español
Central Español

See also
Spanish (disambiguation)
Spain (disambiguation)
España (disambiguation)
Espanola (disambiguation)